Drenge are an English three-piece rock band made up of Eoin Loveless, on guitar and vocals, his younger brother Rory, on drums, and Rob Graham on bass. The brothers grew up in Castleton, Derbyshire, where they formed the band in 2010, relocating to Sheffield in 2014. They have released two albums, Drenge in 2013 and Undertow in 2015.

Albums

Studio albums

Live albums

Extended plays

Singles
"Bloodsports" (04/03/2013) on Infectious Music

"Backwaters" (17/05/2013) on Infectious Music

"Face Like a Skull" (19/07/2013) on Infectious Music

References

Discographies of British artists
Rock music discographies